The 2018–19 Swiss Challenge League (referred to as the Brack.ch Challenge League for sponsoring reasons) was the 16th season of the Swiss Challenge League, the second tier of competitive football in Switzerland, under its current name. The season started on 20 July 2018 and ended on 26 May 2019. The winter break was scheduled between 16 December 2018 and 1 February 2019.

Participating teams
A total of 10 teams participated in the league. 2017–18 Swiss Challenge League champions Neuchâtel Xamax were promoted to the 2018–19 Swiss Super League. They were replaced by FC Lausanne-Sport, who got relegated after finishing last-placed in the 2017–18 Swiss Super League. FC Wohlen was relegated after finishing 10th. They were replaced by SC Kriens, who won promotion from the 2017–18 Swiss Promotion League.

Stadia and locations

Personnel

League table

Results

First and Second Round

Third and Fourth Round

Promotion play-offs
Ninth placed team of 2018–19 Swiss Super League, Xamax, faced Aarau, the runner-up of 2018–19 Swiss Challenge League.

First leg

Second leg

Neuchâtel Xamax won on penalties after drawing 4–4 on aggregate and will stay in the Swiss Super League.

References

External links
 
Soccerway

Swiss Challenge League
2018–19 in Swiss football
Swiss Challenge League seasons